The knockout stage of UEFA Euro 1996 was a single-elimination tournament involving the eight teams that qualified from the group stage of the tournament. There were three rounds of matches, with each round eliminating half of the teams, culminating in two teams playing in the final to determine the winners of the tournament. The knockout stage began with the quarter-finals on 22 June and ended with the final on 30 June 1996 at Wembley Stadium in London. Germany won the tournament with a 2–1 victory over the Czech Republic achieved by a golden goal during extra time.

All times British Summer Time (UTC+1)

Format
Any game in the knockout stage that was undecided by the end of the regular 90 minutes, was followed by up to 30 minutes of extra time (two 15-minute halves). For the first time in a major football competition, the golden goal rule was applied, whereby the match would immediately end upon either team scoring during the extra time period and the goalscoring team being declared the winner. If scores were still level after 30 minutes of extra time, there would be a penalty shoot-out to determine who progressed to the next round. As with every tournament since UEFA Euro 1984, there was no third place play-off.

Qualified teams
The top two placed teams from each of the four groups qualified for the knockout stage.

Bracket

Quarter-finals

Spain vs England

France vs Netherlands

Germany vs Croatia

Czech Republic vs Portugal

Semi-finals

France vs Czech Republic

Germany vs England

Final

References

External links

 UEFA Euro 1996 official history

Knockout stage
1996
Knockout
Knockout
Knockout
Knockout
Knockout
Knockout
Knockout
Knockout
England–Germany football rivalry